Petravec may refer to places:

 Petráveč, a municipality and village in the Czech Republic
 Petravec, Croatia, a village near Velika Gorica